Luke and Lucy: The Texas Rangers (original title Suske en Wiske: De Texas Rakkers, also released as Spike and Suzy: The Texas Rangers) is a 2009 Belgian-Luxembourgish-Dutch CGI animated western comedy adventure film released on 21 July 2009 as the first of it kind to be created in Belgium in a projected 13 animated films, at a rate of one per year. The film is based on the Belgian comic book characters Luke and Lucy (published in English as Spike and Suzy and Willy and Wanda). The film is directed by Mark Mertens and Wim Bien, and produced by Skyline Entertainment, in partnership with CoToon, LuxAnimation, BosBros, and WAT Productions. The film was first announced in a 1 July 2005 press release. The Flanders Audiovisual Fund announced on 20 April 2006 that it would provide €12,500 for script development, and a further €237,500 was announced in September 2007 for production of the film. The total budget of the film is €9 million, making it the most expensive Flemish-Belgian film to date.

Character voices for the Flemish version are being provided by Staf Coppens (Suske), Evelien Verhegge (Wiske), Lucas Van Den Eynde (Lambik), Sien Eggers (Sidonie) and Filip Peeters (Jerom). Character voices for the Dutch version are being provided by Frank Lammers, Jeroen van Koningsbrugge, Pierre Bokma, Kees Boot, Raymonde de Kuyper, Marijn Klaver, and Nanette Drazic.  
Voice recording for the Dutch version of the film took place from 23 February until 6 March 2009 in Cinemeta Amsterdam.

Voice actors for the English version were Guilherme Apollonio (Luke), (Chloe Dolandis) (Lucy), Gregg Weiner (Ambrose), Sally Bondi (Aunt Sybil), Ken Clement (Wilbur), Todd Durkin (Professor Barnabas), (Billy Ray Cyrus) (Sheriff Cooper/Jim Parasite), Aubrey Shavonn (Miss Missy), James Keller (Ranger Tom), Dave Dreisin (Theodore & Theophil Boomerang), Carlos Alayeto (Manuel), (Paul Homza) (Rick), (Scott Genn) (Bill Buster), and Barry Tarallo (Jules).

Plot
Luke and Lucy find out that a masked villain called Jim Parasite has kidnapped and shrunk all the Texas Rangers. They leave for Dark City, Texas with their friends and settle in the Texas Rangers' HQ. It quickly becomes clear that they are not welcome. Parasite terrorizes the city and has spies everywhere. Saloon dancer Miss Missy decides to join Luke and Lucy, but Aunt Sybil doesn't trust her and suspects that she is secretly in cahoots with Parasite. Is she jealous of Ambrose (Frank Lammers) and Wilbur's (Kees Boot) interest in Miss Missy? Luke and Lucy don't trust the Sheriff (Billy Ray Cyrus) or the grocer, Theodore, who acts suspiciously. After a confrontation with Parasite, Luke and Lucy realize that the Sheriff's cast is fake, and they discover that a closet in Miss Missy's hotel room is filled with weapons. Who is the real culprit?

Cast
Frank Lammers as Lambik (Ambrose)
Kees Boot as Jerom (Wilbur)
Jeroen van Koningsbrugge as Theofiel and Theodore
Pierre Bokma as Professor Barabas
Raymonde de Kuyper as Aunt Sidonia (Aunt Sybil)
Marijn Klaver as Suske (Luke)
Nanette Drazic as Wiske (Lucy)

Production
On 14 January 2009, it was announced that Mark Mertens and Wim Bien would direct a 2009 Belgian-Luxembourgish-Dutch computer animated western comedy adventure theatrical released film titled Luke and Lucy: The Texas Rangers which would be released in cinemas on 21 July 2009 in Belgium and 23 July 2009 in the Netherlands. Eric Wirix would produce and write the movie with the budget of €9 million. Dirk Nielandt and Guy Mortier would also write the movie. It was also announced that Frank Lammers, Kees Boot, Jeroen van Koningsbrugge, Pierre Bokma, Raymonde de Kuyper, Marijn Klaver and Nanette Drazic would star in the movie. Bridge Entertainment Group acquired distribution rights to the film. Ian Marien would compose the music for the movie. Skyline Entertainment, CoBo Fonds, Algemene Vereniging Radio Omroep (AVRO), Studio Vandersteen, Standaard Uitgeverij, Cotoon Studio, Flanders Audiovisual Fund (VAF) and LuxAnimation would also produce the movie. The movie's soundtrack contains "Land of Milk and Honey" performed by The Flying Carrots and Arno, "Yellow Rose" performed by Maurane & Beverly Jo Scott, "Bad Girl" performed by Beverly Jo Scott and "Dat Ben Jij" performed by Jim Bakkum.

Release
The film was theatrically released on 21 July 2009 by Bridge Entertainment Group and was released on DVD and Blu-ray on 22 February 2011 by Bridge Entertainment Group.

Soundtrack
 Land of Milk and Honey - The Flying Carrots feat. Arno
 Yellow Rose – Maurane & Beverly Jo Scott
 Bad Girl – Beverly Jo Scott
 Dat Ben Jij – Jim Bakkum

See also
List of animated feature-length films
List of computer-animated films
Spike and Suzy

References

External links
 
 Plans for franchise of $12.8m Benelux animation Luke and Lucy

Spike and Suzy
2009 computer-animated films
2009 films
Belgian animated films
Dutch animated films
Belgian children's films
Films based on Belgian comics
Animated films based on comics
2000s children's adventure films
2009 Western (genre) films